Tom Shaw may refer to:

 Tom Shaw (American football) (Thomas L. Shaw, 1928–2017), college football quarterback for Stanford University
 Tom Shaw (footballer) (Thomas William Shaw, born 1986), English footballer currently playing for Chester F.C
 Tom Shaw (golfer) (Thomas G. Shaw, born 1938), American golfer
 Tom Shaw (politician) (Thomas Shaw, 1872–1938), British Labour politician in the 1920s and 1930s
 Tom Shaw (producer), founder & executive producer of Digital Theatre
 Tom W. Shaw (born 1961), American politician from Iowa
 Tom Shaw (bishop) (1945–2014), American Episcopal bishop of Massachusetts

See also
 Thomas Shaw (disambiguation)